Romeo "Ome" D. Candazo (June 18, 1952 – August 19, 2013) was a Filipino politician, lawyer, writer and television and radio anchor who served as the representative for Marikina's at-large district from 1992 to 2001. In 1996, he met with a group of editors from the Philippine Daily Inquirer, anonymously testifying against the systematic corruption in the Countrywide Development Fund (CDF). His testimony would later become the subject of the publication's exposé on the CDF.

Early life and education
Candazo was born in Marikina, Rizal on June 18, 1952. He studied law at the University of the Philippines. He obtained his AB History Degree in 1975 and finished his studies in 1986, passing the bar exam in the following year.

Activism
During his time as a student, he became involved with student activism; he was a member of the Samahang Demokratiko ng Kabataan (SDK), co-founding its Marikina chapter, and also became the first Secretary General of the Youth and Students Bureau of the Communist Party of the Philippines. As an activist during Ferdinand Marcos's regime, he was imprisoned thrice: in 1973, 1975 and 1979.

Political career

Congressional career
In 1992, Candazo was elected to the House of Representatives, representing Marikina's at-large district. Throughout the course of his tenure, he had authored or co-authored 488 bills in congress. He was noted for his efforts to provide livelihood opportunities and skills training to his poverty-stricken citizens within the city.

In August 1996, Candazo met with editors of the Philippine Daily Inquirer. He elaborated how legislators and other government officials earned from overpricing projects in order to receive large commissions. Articles published following the meetings sparked public outrage over the misuse of the  Countrywide Development Fund (CDF). His identity remained undisclosed up to his death.

Candazo left the office on June 30, 2001; he was succeeded by future mayor Del de Guzman.

2010 Congressional campaign

In 2010, Candazo sought a comeback to the House of Representatives. He ran in the 2nd district under the Pwersa ng Masang Pilipino banner. He lost to Miro Quimbo, placing third in the polls. He received 10,883 votes, or 13.52% of the votes.

Death
Candazo died on August 19, 2013, of a heart attack. His wake was held in Concepcion Uno, Marikina.

Electoral history

References

1952 births
2013 deaths
Filipino socialists
Members of the House of Representatives of the Philippines from Marikina
People from Marikina
People from Rizal